Stigmella oplismeniella is a moth of the family Nepticulidae. It is only known from Kyushu in Japan.

Adult are on wing from mid-May to early June. There is probably one generation per year.

The larvae feed on Oplismenus undulatifolius. They mine the leaves of their host plant. The mine consists of a linear, full depth gallery, which usually runs longitudinally along the leaf margin and then doubles back three or four times. It is semi-transparent, pale green to pale brown, with a longitudinal black frass line in the centre. Later, the frass line becomes more disseminated, sometimes in zigzag arcs.

References 

Nepticulidae
Moths of Japan
Moths described in 1985